The men's 200 metre backstroke competition of the swimming events at the 2011 Pan American Games took place on 21 October at the Scotiabank Aquatics Center.  The defending Pan American Games champion was Thiago Pereira of Brazil.

This race consisted of four lengths of the pool, all in backstroke.

Records
Prior to this competition, the existing world and Pan American Games records were as follows:

Qualification
Each National Olympic Committee (NOC) was able to enter up to two entrants providing they had met the A standard (2:04.1) in the qualifying period (January 1, 2010 to September 4, 2011). NOCs were also permitted to enter one athlete providing they had met the B standard (2:07.8) in the same qualifying period.

Results
All times are in minutes and seconds.

Heats
The first round was held on October 21.

Final A 
The final was held on October 21.

References

Swimming at the 2011 Pan American Games